The Norwegian Red Cross (Norges Røde Kors) was founded on 22 September 1865 by prime minister Frederik Stang. In 1895 the Norwegian Red Cross began educating nurses, and in 1907 the Norwegian Ministry of Defence authorized the organization for voluntary medical aid in war. The Norwegian Red Cross was one of the first national organizations in the International Red Cross.

The organization now has 150,000 members and provides a variety of humanitarian services, including care for old and the infirm, prisoner visits, outdoor rescue, and international work.

Presidents

1865–1880 Frederik Stang
1880–1889 Christian August Selmer
1889–1905 Johan Fredrik Thaulow
1905–1908 Ernst Motzfeldt
1908–1912 Andreas Martin Seip
1912–1913 Christian Wilhelm Engel Bredal Olssøn
1913–1917 Hans Jørgen Darre-Jenssen
1917–1922 Hieronymus Heyerdahl
1922–1930 Torolf Prytz
1930–1940 Jens Meinich
1940–1945 Fridtjof Heyerdahl
1945–1947 Nikolai Nissen Paus
1947–1957 Erling Steen
1957–1966 Ulf Styren
1966–1975 Torstein Dale
1975 Grethe Johnsen (acting)
1975–1981 Hans Høegh
1981–1987 Bjørn Egge
1987–1993 Bjørn Bruland
1993–1998 Astrid Nøklebye Heiberg
1998–2008 Thorvald Stoltenberg
2008–2018 Sven Mollekleiv
2018-2020 Robert Mood
Since 2020 Thor Inge Sveinsvoll

External links
 English language website for Norwegian Red Cross

 
1865 establishments in Norway
Organizations established in 1865